Egilwart was the bishop of Würzburg from 803 until 810. Of him nothing more is known.

Notes

Sources

810 deaths
Roman Catholic bishops of Würzburg
Year of birth unknown
Year of death unknown